Shuyak Island State Park is an approximately 47,000 acre Alaska state park on most of Shuyak Island in the Kodiak Archipelago. The park includes a coastal forest of Sitka spruce, coastline, beaches, and waterways.

The park contains four cabins for recreational use and is only accessible via air or water.

References

State parks of Alaska
Protected areas of Kodiak Island Borough, Alaska